William Alfred Spouncer (1 July 1877 – 31 August 1962) was an English footballer, who played as an outside left.

Career
Born in Gainsborough, Spouncer first played for hometown club Gainsborough Trinity during the 1893–94 season. He joined Sheffield United in October 1895, where he would stay until May 1897, when he signed professionally for Nottingham Forest. He won the FA Cup in 1898 and the Division Two title in 1907. After leaving Forest in 1910, and failing to find a new club, he retired the following year.

Internationally, he earned one cap for England in 1900, against Wales.

Spouncer had a brief foray into management with Barcelona, taking charge of the Catalans during the 1923–24 season. He won the Campionat de Catalunya with ten wins out of ten, but in the Copa del Rey, his Barcelona side were soundly beaten 6–1 in the semi-final replay against the eventual winners, Real Unión.

Honours
 Nottingham Forest
 FA Cup winner: 1898

References

1877 births
1962 deaths
English footballers
England international footballers
Gainsborough Trinity F.C. players
Sheffield United F.C. players
Nottingham Forest F.C. players
English Football League players
Association football outside forwards
FA Cup Final players